The Tasmanian Premier's Literary Prizes are literary prizes that are awarded biennially in four categories by the Tasmanian Government. There are two panels of three judges: one for the book prizes, the other for the emerging writers and young writer's fellowship. In September 2021 the Tasmanian Government announced that the awards had been renamed the Tasmanian Literary Awards, would only be open to writers living in Tasmania. The six new categories are:

 fiction
 non-fiction
 young readers and children
 Indigenous writing
 poetry and short stories
 young writers fellowship

Tasmania Book Prize winners

Awarded for the best book with Tasmanian content.

Margaret Scott Prize winners

This prize, named in honour of well-known Tasmanian writer, Margaret Scott (1934–2005) is awarded for the best book by a Tasmanian author.

University of Tasmania Prize winners

The first three awards were for best book by a Tasmanian publisher. Since 2013 the University of Tasmania Prize has been awarded for the best new unpublished literary work by an emerging Tasmanian writer.

Tasmanian Young Writer's Fellowship winners

Awarded to a young writer and sponsored by philanthropists. In its first year it was open to writers under 35, but for 2017 the age was lowered to under 30.

References

External links
 

Australian literary awards
Awards established in 2007
Tasmanian literature
Tasmania-related lists
Culture of Tasmania
Australian literature-related lists